Four naval vessels of Japan have been named Asashio:

 , lead ship of the 1936 Asashio class
 , lead ship of the 1965 Asashio class

See also
, a class of ten destroyers of the Imperial Japanese Navy during World War II
, a class of four submarines of the Japanese Maritime Self-Defense Force in 1965

Imperial Japanese Navy ship names
Japan Maritime Self-Defense Force ship names
Japanese Navy ship names